The regions of Burkina Faso are divided into 45 administrative provinces. These 45 provinces are currently sub-divided into 351 departments or communes.

List of provinces by region

Here is a list of the provinces, with their capitals in parentheses:

Central Burkina Faso

Centre Region
 Kadiogo (Ouagadougou) (#14 in map)

Centre-Nord Region
 Bam (Kongoussi) (#2 in map)
 Namentenga (Boulsa) (#26 in map)
 Sanmatenga (Kaya) (#34 in map)

Centre-Sud Region
 Bazèga (Kombissiri) (#4 in map)
 Nahouri (Pô) (#25 in map)
 Zoundwéogo (Manga) (#45 in map)

Plateau-Central Region
 Ganzourgou (Zorgho) (#9 in map)
 Kourwéogo (Boussé) (#21 in map)
 Oubritenga (Ziniaré) (#29 in map)

Eastern Burkina Faso

Centre-Est Region
 Boulgou (Tenkodogo) (#6 in map)
 Koulpélogo (Ouargaye) (#19 in map)
 Kouritenga (Koupéla) (#20 in map)

Est Region
 Gnagna (Bogandé) (#10 in map)
 Gourma (Fada N'gourma) (#11 in map)
 Komondjari (Gayéri) (#16 in map)
 Kompienga (Pama) (#17 in map)
 Tapoa (Diapaga) (#39 in map)

Northern Burkina Faso

Nord Region
 Loroum (Titao) (#23 in map)
 Passoré (Yako) (#31 in map)
 Yatenga (Ouahigouya) (#42 in map)
 Zondoma (Gourcy) (#44 in map)

Sahel Region
 Oudalan (Gorom-Gorom) (#30 in map)
 Séno (Dori) (#35 in map)
 Soum (Djibo) (#37 in map)
 Yagha (Sebba) (#41 in map)

Southern Burkina Faso

Cascades Region
 Comoé (Banfora) (#8 in map)
 Léraba (Sindou) (#22 in map)

Hauts-Bassins Region
 Houet (Bobo-Dioulasso) (#12 in map)
 Kénédougou (Orodara) (#15 in map)
 Tuy (Houndé) (#40 in map)

Sud-Ouest Region
 Bougouriba (Diébougou) (#5 in map)
 Ioba (Dano) (#13 in map)
 Noumbiel (Batié) (#28 in map)
 Poni (Gaoua) (#32 in map)

Western Burkina Faso

Boucle du Mouhoun Region
 Balé (Boromo) (#1 in map)
 Banwa (Solenzo) (#3 in map)
 Kossi (Nouna) (#18 in map)
 Mouhoun (Dédougou) (#24 in map)
 Nayala (Toma) (#27 in map)
 Sourou (Tougan) (#38 in map)

Centre-Ouest Region
 Boulkiemdé (Koudougou) (#7 in map)
 Sanguié (Réo) (#33 in map)
 Sissili (Léo) (#36 in map)
 Ziro (Sapouy) (#43 in map)

Populations of the 45 Provinces

See also
 Geography of Burkina Faso
 Regions of Burkina Faso
 Communes of Burkina Faso
 ISO 3166-2:BF

References

External links
 Provinces of Burkina Faso at Statoids.com

 
Subdivisions of Burkina Faso
Burkina Faso 2
Burkina Faso, Provinces
Provinces, Burkina Faso
Burkina Faso geography-related lists